Chunui Station is a station on Seoul Subway Line 7.

Station layout

Railway stations opened in 2012
Seoul Metropolitan Subway stations
Metro stations in Bucheon